Dainis Deglis (born 26 January 1959 in Smiltene) is a former Latvian football defender, who was called the Latvian rifleman while he played for FK Daugava Rīga. Currently, he is a member of the board and the main shareholder at the Latvian Higher League club FK Daugava Rīga.

Playing career

Almost his entire senior football career Deglis played for Daugava Rīga, capping more than 350 appearances for the team, quite often being the only Latvian origin player on the field (thus – the Latvian rifleman). Playing with the head was known as his strong side. In 1980–1981 he tried to secure himself a position in FC Dynamo Moscow but after failing to participate in a single match for Dynamo he returned to Riga where under the management of Jānis Skredelis Daugava was climbing out of the hole where it had spent the late Seventies – early Eighties and two years in a row nearly earned a promotion to the top Soviet league.

Just when the results for Daugava were getting worse again Deglis moved to Zvejnieks Liepāja where he spent the 1987–1988 seasons. In 1989 he again was a player of Daugava, then for one year he played with FC KooTeePee in Finland.

References

1959 births
People from Smiltene
Living people
Soviet footballers
Latvian footballers
Daugava Rīga players
Soviet expatriate footballers
FC KooTeePee players
Expatriate footballers in Finland
Soviet expatriate sportspeople in Finland
FC Dynamo Moscow players
Association football defenders